Mount Peter may refer to:

 Mount Peter (Antarctica), a mountain in Antarctica
 Mount Peter (New York), a mountain in the United States of America
 Mount Peter, Queensland, a locality in the Cairns Region, Queensland, Australia